In 2004, a scandal occurred when one of four lottery tickets didn't go to a prearranged winner, resulting in the arrest of five people and several government officials being removed.

The Shaanxi Provincial Sports Lottery Centre refused to give the unexpected winner, Liu Liang, the prize of a new BMW, claiming that he held a fake lottery ticket. The court found that Yang Yongming, a contractor to the lottery company, had cheated on the four top prizes. The lottery center authorities declared that Liu's ticket was valid and apologized. The car was sold for 300,000 yuan, and Liu Liang retreated to a remote village on Qinling Mountain.

References

External links 
 Liu Liang inside his car, June 4, 2004

Chinese Lottery Scandal, 2004
Gambling in China
Lottery fraud